Mostapha Sahel (5 May 1946 in Ouled Frej, El Jadida – 7 October 2012 in Rabat) was the minister of the interior of Morocco. He holds a degree in public law. He used to be minister of fishing. His successor was Chakib Benmoussa. After leaving the government he held the position of advisor to King Mohamed VI until his death.

Mostapha Sahel was also the CEO of the Tourism and Real estate firm SOMED.

Biography
In 1964 he obtained a literary Baccalauréat from the Lycée Mohammed V of Casablanca in 1964 and graduated in 1967 from the Mohammed V University in Rabat with a Licence degree. In 1969 he obtained a DES (Diplôme d'études supérieures) from France, a defunct French degree which was required for the Concours of civil service. In 1970 he joined the Inspection General de Finances.

Sources 

https://web.archive.org/web/20061021012808/http://www.mincom.gov.ma/french/minister/biographies/MustaphaSahel.htm
http://www.bibliomonde.com/pages/fiche-geo-donnee.php3?id_page_donnee=41
https://web.archive.org/web/20060605124456/http://www.radiokcentrale.it/news4.htm

1946 births
2012 deaths
Government ministers of Morocco
People from El Jadida
Ambassadors of Morocco to France
Permanent Representatives of Morocco to the United Nations
Advisors of Mohammed VI of Morocco
Moroccan chief executives
Mohammed V University alumni